Jaak Tamm (25 February 1950 – 4 January 1999) was an Estonian politician and businessman.

From 1990 to 1991, he was the minister of industry and energetics in Edgar Savisaar's government. He was a member of the Estonian Coalition Party. From 1992 to 1996, he was the mayor of Tallinn. 

He died of heart disease in 1999.

References

1950 births
1999 deaths
Mayors of Tallinn
Politicians from Tallinn
University of Tartu alumni
Estonian Coalition Party politicians
20th-century Estonian politicians